Ophrys tenthredinifera, the sawfly orchid, is a terrestrial species of orchid native to the Mediterranean region from Portugal and Morocco to Turkey. The common name refers to a purported resemblance between the flower and the sawfly, a wasp-like insect.

Many subspecies, varieties and forms have been proposed, but as of May 2014, none are recognized.

References

External links 

tenthredinifera
Orchids of Europe
Orchids of France
Flora of Albania
Flora of the Balearic Islands
Flora of Sardinia
Flora of Sicily
Flora of Greece
Flora of Turkey
Flora of Crete
Flora of Algeria
Flora of Libya
Flora of Morocco
Flora of Tunisia
Flora of Cyprus
Plants described in 1805